Coggs is a surname. Notable people with the surname include:

 Elizabeth M. Coggs (born 1956), American politician
 Granville C. Coggs (1925 - 2019), U.S. medical doctor, pilot with the Tuskegee Airmen
 Isaac N. Coggs (1920–1973), American politician
 Marcia P. Coggs (1928–2003), American politician
 Spencer Coggs (born 1949), American public administrator and politician